De Fire Søstre (English: The Four Sisters) was the name of five separate ships which served purely as merchant ships or, for part of their lives, hospital and supply ships to the Danish fleet.

Danish Royal Navy ships
De Fire Søstre  (pre-1737)
This ship acted for much of its career as a fleet auxiliary captained by officers commissioned in the Royal Danish Navy.
Converted (or rebuilt) in 1740, under Captain-Lieutenant Hans Christian Lund, she is described as a fleet merchant ship. In 1741 she carried  a cargo of hemp from Riga to the Danish shipyard at Holmen, Copenhagen.

In 1761, under Captain-Lieutenant Gottlieb Joachim Dilleben, De Fire Søstre was employed by the Danish Customs Department acting against smugglers in Danish waters.  
Under P G M Schultz the ship is described as a hospital ship and troop transport, taking troops to Norway in 1762 and then as the hospital ship in the fleet in 1763.  She may have continued the anti-smuggling duties into 1764.  

De Fire Søstre (1764)
De Fire Søstre was a merchant ship designed by F M Krabbe and built at Nyholm naval dockyard, Copenhagen.
In the campaign against the Algerian corsairs of 1770 -1772 the ship, captained by Jens Knudsen served as a hospital ship to the Danish Mediterranean squadron. This was her last mission as she was decommissioned in 1771.

Civilian ships
De Fire Søstre  (pre-1750)
The ship was built in Germany, bought in Altona and worked in the whaling trade from 1752 to 1758. After 1750 it belonged to  det Almindelige Handelskompagni (the Ordinary Trading Company) of Copenhagen. The ship was registered in Denmark, apparently as  an ordinary merchant ship.
  
De Fire Søstre (1791)
Built in Svendborg on the Danish island of Funen by Niels Hansen in 1791, this ship was rigged as a yacht with a single mast. She was owned and operated out of Svenborg from 1825 to 1849 by H J Baagøe (Shippers).  Her final fate is not recorded.

De Fire Søstre (1850)
Built by L J Bager in Marstal, this ship was launched on 11 May 1850.  Measuring 44.5 ft by 13.1 ft and with a draught of 6.9 ft, she was rigged as a yacht with a single mast. From 1850 to 1891 this ship was known as De Fire Søstre, sometimes recorded as De 4 Søstre.   De Fire Søstre was initially owned jointly by two men,  Rasmus Olsen of Skælskør and Hans Clausen Christensen of Marstal. After 1877 the former became the sole owner.
After 1891 it was renamed Caroline of Marstal.  As Caroline she plied her trade until 1901, owned by Captain Claus Christensen Eriksen of Marstal.

Notes

References

External links
Marcussen home page
Marcussen Shiplist
The Royal Danish Naval Museum and then >DATABASE>SIMPEL>Danske Navne>and choose your ship, or simply this link.
 Skibregister (den sorte registrand) - There is also access to all the coded sources and the usual caveats!
T. A. Topsøe-Jensen og Emil Marquard (1935) “Officerer i den dansk-norske Søetat 1660-1814 og den danske Søetat 1814-1932“. Two volumes. Download here.

Royal Danish Navy ship names